The Norway women's youth national handball team is the national under–17 Handball team of the Norway. Controlled by the Norwegian Handball Federation it represents the country in international matches.

History

Youth Olympic Games
 Champions   Runners up   Third place   Fourth place

IHF U-18 World Championship
 Champions   Runners up   Third place   Fourth place

European U-17 Championship
 Champions   Runners up   Third place   Fourth place

References

External links
Official website

Handball in Norway
Women's national youth handball teams
Handball